Nevada is a 1935 American Western film directed by Charles Barton and written by Garnett Weston and Stuart Anthony. It is based on the 1928 novel Nevada by Zane Grey. The film stars Buster Crabbe, Kathleen Burke, Syd Saylor, Monte Blue, William Duncan and Richard Carle. The film was released on November 29, 1935, by Paramount Pictures.

The film's sets were designed by the art director David S. Garber.

Cast
Buster Crabbe as Jim Lacey aka 'Nevada' 
Kathleen Burke as Hettie Ide
Syd Saylor as Cash Burridge
Monte Blue as Clem Dillon
William Duncan as Ben Ide
Richard Carle as Judge Franklidge
Frank Sheridan as Tom Blaine
Raymond Hatton as Sheriff
Stanley Andrews as Cawthorne
Leif Erickson as Bill Ide
Jack Kennedy as McTurk
Henry Roquemore as Bartender
William L. Thorne as Poker Player
Harry Dunkinson as Poker Player
Barney Furey as Bystander
Frank Rice as Shorty
William Desmond as Wilson
Dutch Hendrian as Henchman

Production
Filming took place in Big Bear Lake, California.

References

External links
 

1935 films
1930s English-language films
American Western (genre) films
1935 Western (genre) films
Paramount Pictures films
Films directed by Charles Barton
Films based on works by Zane Grey
Films shot in Big Bear Lake, California
American black-and-white films
1930s American films